Emmanuella Samuel (born July 22, 2010), mononymously known as Emmanuella, is a Nigerian YouTube child comedian on Mark Angel's YouTube channel. Emmanuella's first appearance was on episode 34, titled "Who Mess?"

Career
Emmanuella made her foray into comedy at the age of five. She was on a family holiday and met with Angel. He needed some children for his comedy shoot, and called a few children he knew for the audition, but they couldn't memorize their lines and he then turned to Emmanuella. Despite the eighteen hour long video shoot, a stunt he pulled to test the endurance of the kids, Emmanuella did well. After her selection, Angel had to convince her parents to let her become a part of the Mark Angel Comedy team and got their approval. And she was featured in Australian movie titled: Survive or Die  She became well known after the comedy skit "My Real Face", in which she was making jokes about a headmistress to a student without knowing the student was the daughter of the headmistress. This short skit was featured on CNN's Facebook page.
On 2 April 2020, during the COVID-19 lockdowns, Emmanuella, Success, and Regina Daniels were featured in a skit by Ofego titled "Lockdown" on his YouTube channel using archive footage.

She had her first try in music on a song titled Yes O; a song in which Makayla Malaka features both she and saxophonist Temilayo Abodunrin.

Awards and recognitions
In 2018, Emanuella was invited to the National Assembly by Senate President Bukola Saraki on account of her landing a role in a Disney film. She made the announcement of her role in the Disney film on her Instagram handle. In 2016, Emanuella won the award for Top Subscribed Creator from YouTube at the inaugural edition of the Sub-Saharan African YouTube Awards. She also won the Best New Comedienne & Princess of Comedy awards at the Afro-Australia Music & Movie Awards (AAMMA). She was hosted by CNN in November 2016. In 2015, she won the G-Influence Niger Delta Special Talent Award. In 2018, she was nominated alongside Davido, for Nickelodeon's 2018 Kid's Choice Awards, under the category of Favorite African Stars, and in 2021, she won the Nickelodeon Kids' Choice Award for Favorite African Social Star

Personal life
Emanuella is from Imo State in eastern Nigeria. She was born in Port Harcourt in Rivers State. There is confusion on her relationship to Mark Angel, as it has been said in different circles that she is his niece and some say they are cousins. Eze Chidinma of Buzz Nigeria in an article stated that Emmanuella is niece to Angel. Pulse Nigeria also stated that Angel is an uncle to Emmanuella. On the other hand, George Ibenegbu of Legit.ng stated that both are cousins. Rachael Odusanya in a later publication on legit.ng stated that they are not related.

References

External links

Living people
2010 births
Nigerian women comedians
Nigerian children
Nigerian YouTubers
People from Port Harcourt
Nigerian film actresses
Actresses from Imo State
Igbo actresses
Comedy YouTubers